Lonsdale Quay is a SeaBus ferry terminal and major transit exchange that serves Metro Vancouver's North Shore municipalities. The quay is located in the City of North Vancouver. The BCIT Marine Campus and Lonsdale Quay Market are located within the vicinity of the quay.

History
Lonsdale Quay opened in 1977 when the SeaBus service began between the quay and Waterfront station in Downtown Vancouver. Prior to the construction of the ferry terminal, the quay was the location of the North Van Ship Repair dock.

In 2016, it was announced that Lonsdale Quay, along with the Waterfront SeaBus terminal, would receive a $12.5 million upgrade. Construction was originally expected to begin in 2017 and to be completed by mid-2018; however, the project timeline was pushed back. Construction began on April 29, 2019, and was fully completed in June 2020.

Services
Lonsdale Quay's SeaBus service crosses Burrard Inlet to Waterfront station in Downtown Vancouver. From there, transit users can connect to other TransLink services, including the SkyTrain rapid transit system and the West Coast Express commuter train.

Security for the bus loop and SeaBus terminal is the responsibility of the Transit Security Department. Transit security officers can be found patrolling the bus loop and the SeaBus terminal. Transit security officers also conduct fare inspections on board the buses and within the Fare Paid Zone of the SeaBus terminal. North Vancouver Royal Canadian Mounted Police also patrol the bus loop and SeaBus terminal.

Station information

Station layout

Entrances
The Lonsdale Quay SeaBus terminal is served by a single entrance at the south end of the bus exchange. Chadwick Court is the street closest to the entrance, though it also connects to the bus exchange.

Transit connections

A covered bus loop is connected to Lonsdale Quay, from which passengers can board buses to Grouse Mountain, Lynn Valley, West Vancouver and other points of interest on the North Shore. Bus bay assignments are as follows:

References

SeaBus
1977 establishments in British Columbia
TransLink (British Columbia) bus stations
Ferry terminals in British Columbia
Buildings and structures in Greater Vancouver